Sonny Karlsson (born March 14, 1993) is a Swedish professional ice hockey centre, currently playing for Diables Rouges de Briançon in the Ligue Magnus. He previously played the majority of the professional career with Mora IK of the HockeyAllsvenskan, the second highest-level league in Sweden.

Career statistics

References

External links

1993 births
Living people
Diables Rouges de Briançon players
Manglerud Star Ishockey players
Mora IK players
Swedish ice hockey left wingers